Pollinkhove is a village in Lo-Reninge, in the Belgian province of West Flanders.

The Lovaart canal separates the village centre from the small city of Lo. The River IJzer forms the south boundary.

The church and parish are named after Saint Bartholomew. The gothic Saint Bartholowew's church has a  tower dating from the 16th century.

External links
Pollinkhove @ City Review

Populated places in West Flanders